Baqçasaray is a rural locality (a posyolok) in Yuğarı Oslan District, Tatarstan. The population was 161 as of 2010.

Geography 
Baqçasaray, Verkhneuslonsky District is located 23 km south of Yuğarı Oslan, district's administrative centre, and 58 km southwest of Qazan, republic's capital, by road.

History 
The village was established in 1923.

Until 1927 was a part of Zöyä Canton; after the creation of districts in Tatar ASSR (Tatarstan) in Tämte (1927–1931), Yuğarı Oslan (1931–1963),  Yäşel Üzän (1963–1965) and Yuğarı Oslan districts.

References

External links 
 

Rural localities in Verkhneuslonsky District